Furnace Mountain is the tallest peak of Catoctin Mountain in Loudoun County, Virginia. Its name arises from the iron furnaces located at its base, which operated from the 1790s to the 1870s. The furnaces were used to process iron ore mined from the mountain, much of which was used to build the burgeoning city of Washington D.C.

References
Scheel, Eugene.  Loudoun Discovered:Communities, Corners and Crossroads. Vol. 2, 2002, pp. 57–59.

Mountains of Loudoun County, Virginia
Blue Ridge Mountains
Ironworks in Virginia
Mountains of Virginia